This is a list of U.S. counties that are named for rivers and streams.

Counties named for rivers (alphabetical by county name)

A
Alamance County, North Carolina: Alamance is named for Great Alamance Creek.
Allegany County, New York: Allegany is a variant spelling of the Allegheny River.
Alleghany County, North Carolina: Alleghany is a corruption of the Native American Delaware tribe's word for the Allegheny River, which is said to have meant a fine stream.
Allegheny County, Pennsylvania: Allegheny is a corruption of the Native American Delaware tribe's word for the Allegheny River, which is said to have meant a fine stream.
Appomattox County, Virginia: Appomattox is named for the Appomattox River, which is in turn named for the Appamatucks Native American people.
Ashtabula County, Ohio: Ashtabula was named for the Ashtabula River.
Asotin County, Washington: Asotin is named for the Nez Percé name for Eel Creek.
Auglaize County, Ohio: Auglaize is named for the Auglaize River.

B
Beaver County, Oklahoma: Beaver is named for its county seat of Beaver, Oklahoma and the Beaver River, which flows through the county.
 Benzie County, Michigan is an Americanization of the French name, Riviere Aux-Bec-Scies, for the local river.
Blanco County, Texas: Blanco is named for the Blanco River. Blanco means white in the Spanish language.
Boise County, Idaho: Boise is named after the Boise River. Boise is French for "timber".
Bosque County, Texas: Bosque is named for the Bosque River.
Brazoria County, Texas: Brazoria is named for the Brazos River.
Brazos County, Texas: Brazos is named for the Brazos River.
Buffalo County, Wisconsin: Buffalo is named for the Buffalo River.

C
Canadian County, Oklahoma: Canadian County is named for the Canadian River, which flows through the county.
Cassia County, Idaho: Cassia is named after Cassia Creek.
Cattaraugus County, New York:Cattargus County is named for Cattaraugus Creek
Cedar County, Iowa: Cedar is named for the Cedar River.
Chariton County, Missouri: Chariton is named from the Chariton River.
Chattahoochee County, Georgia: Chattahoochee is named for the Chattahoochee River of Georgia, which also forms part of the Alabama-Georgia state line.
Chattooga County, Georgia: Chattooga is named for the Chattooga River in northeast Georgia.
Cheboygan County, Michigan is named for the Cheboygan River, which was itself a Native American name.
Chippewa County, Minnesota is named after the Chippewa River, which flows through the county.
Clear Creek County, Colorado: Clear Creek is named for Clear Creek, which runs through the county.
Clearwater County, Idaho: Clearwater is named after the Clearwater River.
Clearwater County, Minnesota is named after the Clearwater River and Clearwater Lake, which are both located within the county.
Colorado County, Texas: Colorado is named for the Colorado River.
Columbia County, Oregon: Named for the Columbia River which it borders.
Columbia County, Washington: Columbia is named for the Columbia River.
Coosa County, Alabama: Named for the Coosa River of Alabama & Georgia 
Cottonwood County, Minnesota is named after the Cottonwood River, which flows through the county.
Costilla County, Colorado: Costilla is named for the Costilla River.
Cuyahoga County, Ohio: Cuyahoga is named for the Cuyahoga River.
Conecuh County, Alabama: Conecuh is named for the Conecuh River in southern Alabama.

D
Des Moines County, Iowa: Des Moines is named for the Des Moines River.
Deschutes County, Oregon: Deschutes is named for the Deschutes River.
Dolores County, Colorado: Dolores is named for the Dolores River, originally Rio de Nuestra Senora de los Dolores, or, in English, "River of our Lady of Sorrows".
DuPage County, Illinois is named after the DuPage River.

E
Eagle County, Colorado: Eagle is named for the Eagle River.
Elk County, Kansas: Elk is named for the Elk River.
Escambia County, Florida: Escambia is named for the Escambia River.
Escambia County, Alabama: Escambia, AL is also named for the Escambia River.

F
Fluvanna County, Virginia: Fluvanna, VA is named for the Fluvanna River, a previous name for the James River. Fluvanna is Latin for Anne's River after Queen Anne of Great Britain.

G
Gila County, Arizona: Gila is named for the Gila River.
Grand County, Colorado: Grand is named for the Grand River, later renamed the Colorado River.
Grand County, Utah: Grand is named for the Grand River, later renamed the Colorado River.
 Greenbrier County, West Virginia: Greenbrier is named for the Greenbrier River.

H
Hillsborough County, Florida: Hillsborough is named for the Hillsborough River (Florida), which in turn is named after Wills Hill, Viscount Hillsborough, a British politician during the period of the American Revolutionary War who ordered the mapping of the river's course.
Hocking County, Ohio: Hocking is named for the Hocking River.
Hood River County, Oregon: Named for the Hood River, a river in the county. 
Humboldt County, Nevada: Humboldt is named for the Humboldt River, named in turn for Friedrich Heinrich Alexander von Humboldt, the famous German scientist, explorer and statesman.
Hudson County, New Jersey: Hudson is named for the Hudson River, which in turn is named after Henry Hudson.

I
Indian River County, Florida: Indian River is named for the Indian River, which is not a real river, but rather is a long, narrow saltwater lagoon between the mainland and the barrier islands.
Iowa County, Iowa: Iowa is named for the Iowa River and the Iowa Native American tribe.

J
Judith Basin County, Montana: Judith Basin is named for the Judith River.

K
 Kalamazoo County, Michigan is named for the Kalamazoo River. Kalamazoo is an Anglicized Native American word which probably meant boiling water.
Kankakee County, Illinois: Kankakee is named after the Kankakee River.
Kanabec County, Minnesota: Kanabec is named after the Snake River, which flows through the area. Kanabec is Ojibwa for snake.
Kanawha County, West Virginia: Kanawha is named for the Kanawha River.
Kennebec County, Maine: Kennebec is named for the Kennebec River.
Kern County, California: Kern is named after the Kern River, which is named in turn for Edward M. Kern, a topographer who accompanied John C. Frémont on an early expedition through the state.
Keya Paha County, Nebraska: Keya Paha is named for the Dakota words Ké-ya Pa-há Wa-kpá, which, translated, mean Turtle Hill River.
Kings County, California: Kings is named for the Kings River.
Koochiching County, Minnesota is named after a Cree word of uncertain meaning given by Ojibwas to Rainy River.

L
Lackawanna County, Pennsylvania: Lackawanna is named after the Lackawanna River.
Las Animas County, Colorado: Las Animas is named for the Las Animas River, originally El Rio de las Animas Perdidas en Purgatorio, or, in English, "River of the Souls Lost in Purgatory".
Latah County, Idaho: Latah is named after Latah Creek.
Lehigh County, Pennsylvania: Leigh is named after the Lehigh River; a tributary of the Delaware River.
 Limestone County, Alabama: Limestone is named for Limestone Creek, which runs through the county and has a bed of limestone.
Little River County, Arkansas: Little River is named for the Little River.
Loup County, Nebraska: Loup is named for the Loup River.

M
Mahoning County, Ohio: Mahoning is named for the Mahoning River.
Malheur County, Oregon: Malheur is named for the Malheur River.
 Manistee County, Michigan was named for the Manistee River, which in turn had Native American name meaning river at whose mouth there are islands.
Maries County, Missouri: Maries is named from the Maries River.
Merrimack County, New Hampshire: Merrimack is named for the Merrimack River.
Mississippi County, Arkansas: Mississippi is named for the Mississippi River.
Mississippi County, Missouri: Mississippi is named after the Mississippi River.
Moniteau County, Missouri: Montineau is named after Moniteau Creek.
Monongalia County, West Virginia: Monongalia is named for the Monongahela River.
 Muskegon County, Michigan is named for the Muskegon River, named for the Ojibwa language word meaning swamp or marsh.
Musselshell County, Montana: Musselshell is named for the Musselshell River, named in turn by the Lewis and Clark Expedition presumably due to mussels found on its banks.

N
Nemaha County, Kansas: Nemaha is named for the Nemaha River.
Nemaha County, Nebraska: Nemaha is named for Nimaha, the Oto name meaning miry water for a stream which crossed the county and emptied into the Missouri River.
Neosho County, Kansas: Neosho is named for the Neosho River.
Niobrara County, Wyoming: Niobrara is named for the Niobrara River. Niobrara is Omaha for flat or broad river.
Nodaway County, Missouri: Nodaway is named from the Nodaway River. Nodaway is a Potawatomi word meaning placid.

O
Oconee County, Georgia: Oconee is named for the Oconee River that forms part of the county's border
 Ohio County, Indiana: Ohio is named for the Ohio River.
 Ohio County, Kentucky: Also named for the Ohio River. When the county was formed, the river formed its northern boundary, but no longer does after several new counties were carved from it. 
 Ohio County, West Virginia: Also named for the Ohio River.
 Ontonagon County, Michigan is named for a river called Nantounagon on an early French map.
Otter Tail County, Minnesota: Otter Tail is named after Otter Tail Lake and Otter Tail River. The river was named by the Ojibwa for its long sandbar shaped like an otter's tail.
Osage County, Kansas: Osage is named for the Osage River.
Oswego County, New York: Oswego is named for the Oswego River.
Ouachita County, Arkansas: Ouachita is named for the Ouachita River.
Ouachita Parish, Louisiana: named for the Ouachita River

P
Payette County, Idaho: Payette is named after the Payette River, which, in turn, is named for explorer Francois Payette.
Pearl River County, Mississippi: Named for the Pearl River, obviously
Pecos County, Texas: Pecos [pey-kuhs] is named after the Pecos River. The name "Pecos" derives from the Keresan (Native American language) term for the Pecos Pueblo, [p'æyok'ona].
Platte County, Nebraska: Platte is named for the Platte River.
Platte County, Wyoming: Platte is named for the North Platte River. Platte is French for flat.
Plumas County, California: Plumas is named for Spanish name for the Feather River (Rio de las Plumas), which flows through the county.
Powder River County, Montana: Powder River is named for the Powder River, which in turn was named for gunpowder-like sand along its banks.

R
 Racine County, Wisconsin: Racine is named for the Root River, racine being the French word for root. 
Rappahannock County, Virginia: Rappahannock is named for the Rappahannock River, named in turn for the Rappahannock Native American people.
Red Lake County, Minnesota: Red Lake County is named after the Red Lake River, named by the Ojibwa for its reddish sand and water.
Red River County, Texas: Red River is named for the Red River.
Red River Parish, Louisiana: named for the Red River
Redwood County, Minnesota: Redwood County is named after the Redwood River, which flows through the county.
Republic County, Kansas: Republic is named for the Republican River, which in turn was named for the Pawnee Republic which once existed near the river.
Rio Arriba County, New Mexico: Rio Arriba is named for its location on the upper Rio Grande. (Rio Arriba is "upper river" in Spanish.)
Rio Blanco County, Colorado: Rio Blanco is named for Rio Blanco, or, in English, the White River.
Rio Grande County, Colorado: Rio Grande is named for the Rio Grande, which runs through the county.
Rock County, Wisconsin: Rock is named for the Rock River.
Roseau County, Minnesota: Roseau County is named after the Roseau Lake and Roseau River.
Rosebud County, Montana: Rosebud is named for the Rosebud River, which was named for the many wild roses along the banks of the river.

S
Sacramento County, California: Named for the Sacramento River
Saline County, Arkansas: Named for the Saline River.
Saline County, Illinois: Named for the Saline River.
Saline County, Kansas: Named for the Saline River.
San Benito County, California: Named for San Benito Creek.
San Juan County, Colorado: Named for the San Juan River and San Juan Mountains. 
San Juan County, New Mexico: Named for the San Juan River.
San Miguel County, Colorado: Named for the San Miguel River.
Santa Cruz County, Arizona: Named for the Santa Cruz River.
Sangamon County, Illinois Named for the Sangamon River.
Scioto County, Ohio: Named for the Scioto River.
Sevier County, Utah: Named for the Sevier River.
Shenandoah County, Virginia:  Named for the Shenandoah River; Shenandoah is a Native American term meaning beautiful daughter of the stars.
Shiawassee County, Michigan: Shiawassee  is named for the Shiawassee River.
St. Francis County, Arkansas: St. Francis is named for the St. Francis River.
St. Johns County, Florida: St. Johns is named for the St. Johns River.
St. Joseph County, Indiana: St. Joseph is named for the St. Joseph River.
St. Joseph County, Michigan: St. Joseph is named for the St. Joseph River
St. Lawrence County, New York: St. Lawrence is named for the St. Lawrence River.
St. Louis County, Minnesota: St. Louis is named after the St. Louis River.
Stillwater County, Montana: Stillwater is named for the Stillwater River, named for its very slow current.
Susquehanna County, Pennsylvania named after the Susquehanna River.
Suwannee County, Florida: Suwannee is named for the Suwannee River, the same river made famous by Stephen Foster in his song Old Folks at Home.
Sweetwater County, Wyoming: Sweetwater is named for the Sweetwater River.

T
 Tallapoosa County, Alabama: Named for the Tallapoosa River. Tallapoosa is believed to be a Choctaw word meaning pulverized rock.
Tangipahoa Parish, Louisiana: Named for the Tangipahoa River
 Tensas Parish, Louisiana: Named for the Tensas River
 Tioga County, Pennsylvania: Named for the Tioga River
Tippecanoe County, Indiana: Tippecanoe is named for the Tippecanoe River and the Battle of Tippecanoe.
 Tuscaloosa County, Alabama: Tuscaloosa was a Native American name for the Black Warrior River.
 Tuscarawas County, Ohio: Tuscarawas is named for the Tuscarawas River.

V
Vermilion County, Illinois: Vermilion is named for both the Vermilion River and the Little Vermilion River.

W
 Wabash County, Indiana: Wabash is named for the Wabash River.
Wabash County, Illinois: Wabash is named for the Wabash River.
Wicomico County, Maryland: Wicomico is named for the Wicomico River. In Lenape,  indicated a place where houses are built, possibly in reference to a settlement.

Y
Yamhill County, Oregon: Yamhill is named after the Yamhill River.
Yellow Medicine County, Minnesota: Yellow Medicine County is named after the Yellow Medicine River, which flows through the county.

Counties possibly named for rivers
Cumberland County, Illinois: Cumberland is named for either the Cumberland River or the Cumberland Road.
San Juan County, Utah: San Juan is possibly named for the San Juan River.
Skamania County, Washington: Skamania is named for a Chinookan word meaning swift water.

Counties indirectly named for rivers
Aroostook County, Maine: Aroostook is named for a Native American word meaning beautiful river.
Canyon County, Idaho: Canyon is named after either the Boise River or Snake River canyons.
 Coös County, New Hampshire: Coös is named for a Native American word meaning crooked, in reference to a bend in the Connecticut River.
Crow Wing County, Minnesota: Crow Wing is named after an island shaped like a raven's wing at the junction of the Crow Wing River and Mississippi River.
Huerfano County, Colorado: Huerfano is named for Huerfano Butte, as was the Huerfano River. Huerfano is orphan in Spanish.
Merced County, California: Merced is named for the Spanish word for mercy, and was named by Spanish explorers in gratitude for water of the Merced River, which was found after a dry 40-mile trek.
Muskingum County, Ohio: Muskingum is a Delaware word meaning by the river side.
Riverside County, California: Riverside is named for the city of Riverside, the county seat, which in turn was named for its location beside the Santa Ana River.
Sagadahoc County, Maine: Sagadahoc is named for a Native American word meaning mouth of big river.
Twin Falls County, Idaho: Twin Falls is named after the double falls along the Snake River.
Yellowstone County, Montana: Yellowstone is named for the yellow rocks found along what is now known as the Yellowstone River.

See also
 County (United States)
 Lists of U.S. county name etymologies

 
Rivers